Florentin or Florentín (from Latin Florentinus) can be a given name or surname. It is found as a given name among Romanian, German, French and Spanish speakers. The latter also use it as a surname.

People

Given name
 Florentin Crihălmeanu (born 1959), Romanian bishop of the Greek-Catholic Church
 Florentin Cruceru (born 1981), Romanian footballer midfielder
 Florentin Dumitru (born 1977), Romanian footballer
 Florentín Giménez (born 1925)
 Florentin Matei (born 1993), Romanian footballer
 Florentin Petre (born 1976), Romanian footballer
 Florentin Pogba (born 1990), French-Guinean football defender

Surname
 Derlis Florentín (1984–2010), Paraguayan footballer
 Lorenzo Álvarez Florentín (born 1926)

Places
 Florentin, Tel Aviv, a neighborhood in the southern part of Tel Aviv
 Florentin, Tarn
 Florentin, Vidin Province, a village in Vidin Province, Bulgaria
 Florentin, Seychelles, an island in Poivre Atoll, Seychelles

See also
 Florentina (disambiguation)
 Florentine (disambiguation)

Romanian masculine given names
Spanish masculine given names